Tommy Bergersen (born 16 October 1972) is a Norwegian football coach and former football midfielder.

Club career
He last played for Bryne. His career peaked when he played for Viking and Bodø/Glimt in the Norwegian Premier League.

Manager years
Bergersen was first manager for Ålgård FK. Bergersen started the job in January 2007. In November 2009 he started to be the manager for Bryne FK. He signed a three-year contract with the club.

References

1972 births
Living people
Norwegian footballers
Lyn Fotball players
Viking FK players
FK Bodø/Glimt players
GIF Sundsvall players
Bryne FK players
Norwegian football managers
Expatriate footballers in Sweden
Norwegian expatriate footballers
Eliteserien players
Allsvenskan players
Sportspeople from Nordland
Bryne FK managers

Association football midfielders